Chen Yutian (born 1984) is a Chinese research scientist currently employed at Deepmind.

Biography
Chen earned his B.E. of Electronic Engineering from Tsinghua University in June 2007. He went to the University of California, Irvine, in the United States to pursue a doctoral degree, and received M.S. and Ph.D. of Computer Science in machine learning respectively in December 2009 and June 2013 respectively under the supervision of Professor Max Welling.

Chen joined Google’s DeepMind division in 2015, becoming a developer on the AlphaGo project.

Awards
Here are the list of awards won by Chen Yutian: 
ICS Dean’s Fellowship, University of California, Irvine (2007)
Amazon AWS in Education Machine Learning Grant (2014)

References

1984 births
Living people
Scientists from Taizhou, Zhejiang
21st-century Chinese scientists
Tsinghua University alumni
University of California, Irvine alumni
Engineers from Zhejiang